In virology, a nonstructural protein is a protein encoded by a virus but that is not part of the viral particle. They typically include the various enzymes and transcription factors the virus uses to replicate itself, such as a viral protease (3CL/nsp5, etc.), an RNA replicase or other template-directed polymerases, and some means to control the host.

Examples
 NSP1 (rotavirus)
 NSP4 (rotavirus)
 NSP5 (rotavirus)
 Influenza non-structural protein
 NS1 influenza protein
 HBcAg, core antigen of hepatitis B
Bunyaviridae nonstructural S proteins

See also 
 Viral structural protein

References